Nicolas Geffrard may refer to:
 Nicolas Geffrard (musician)
 Nicolas Geffrard (general)